Nitte Meenakshi Institute of Technology (NMIT) is an autonomous engineering college in Bangalore, Karnataka, India affiliated to the Visvesvaraya Technological University, Belagavi.

About 
NMIT was started by Vinaya Hegde, son of founder of NMAMIT, late Justice K. S. Hegde in 2001 after the success of Nitte Mahalinga Adyanathaya Memorial Institute of Technology (NMAMIT) at Nitte. The campus is on a  site in Govindapura, Gollahalli village 3 km from Baglur cross, on the way to Devanahalli airport on Hyderabad-Bangalore NH 7 and it is 25 km from Centre of Bengaluru.

The college is and approved by the All India Council for Technical Education. It offers a four-year graduate programme in engineering leading to the award of the degree Bachelor of Engineering (B.E.). The college postgraduate programmes in Master of Computer Applications - MCA, M.Tech in Computer Networking Engineering, Digital Communications & Netwotking Engineering, VLSI & Embedded Systems, Computer Science & Engineering, Master of Business Administration (MBA), M.Tech in Thermal Power Engineering, Machine Design, Structural Engineering

Student activities

Anaadyanta - NMIT's techno-cultural fest

The institution hosts its inter-collegiate techno-cultural and management fest under this banner. It started in 2004 with around 20 events and 19 performing colleges. It has popular attendance from mainly engineering colleges from across the country. It usually takes place for 3 days in the second week of March.

In 2009 38 events were lined up in two days.

The IEEE Student Branch

They run conferences, seminars, project work on research topics. Activities include:
 Nine students from IEEE, NMIT, have been a part of student leadership congress held at NITK, Surathkal on 13 and 14 October 2007.
 AURA IEEE members and second year students had an industrial visit to CPRI Bangalore.
 Six Members from AURA have been to SJCE, Mysore to participate in Cyberia '08.
 On 29 November 2007 a Technical Session was held on Mobile Television given by Mr. Prasanth Rao from Motorola.
 Three Members as part of a team presented a paper titled 'Wireless Surveillance System' at B.R.V Vardhan Memorial IEEE Bangalore Section paper presentation.
 As part of a team, two NMIT IEEE Members represented IEEE Bangalore Section at the 125th Anniversary Region 10 Student Congress at NUS, Singapore.
 A team of two final-year students won the best paper award at the International Conference on Anti-counterfeiting, Security, and Identification in Communication, in the Communications stream, held during 20–22 August 2009 at Hong Kong.

It has a website developed by its members.

The CSI NMIT Students' Branch

The Computer Society of India (CSI) inaugurated the NMIT Students' Branch on 19 May 2008 where Mr. Iqbal Ahmed, the former chairman of CSI Bangalore Chapter, was invited as a chief guest.

Yantra: Nitte Mechanical Engineering Students Association
Yantra was inaugurated in 2003 with a student and staff membership of 80. Today Yantra has more than 500 students and staff members which includes alumni students in India and other countries. Yantra was the first branch in NMIT to come out with its annual magazine MECHZINE even before the college annual magazine in 2004.  The Yantra website is www.iyantra.in.

Rankings

Nitte Meenakshi Institute of Technology was ranked 183 among engineering colleges by the National Institutional Ranking Framework (NIRF) in 2022.

References

External links
 

Educational institutions established in 2001
Engineering colleges in Bangalore
All India Council for Technical Education
2001 establishments in Karnataka